Nicolás Galvis Llano (born 9 April 1997) is a professional soccer player who plays as a midfielder for Scrosoppi FC in League1 Ontario. Born in Colombia and raised in Canada, he has previously accepted call-ups to the Canada national team.

Early life
Galvis was born in Bogotá, Colombia and lived with his family in Manizales and began playing soccer at age five with Once Caldas. At the age of seven, his family moved to St. Catharines, Canada, where he began playing with St. Catharines Concord SC. Afterwards, he played youth soccer with Oakville SC and in February 2013, he went to trial with Uruguayan club Defensor Sporting, where he was invited to stay on with the U16 team. He returned to Canada and played youth soccer with Burlington SC.

In 2015, he began playing college soccer with the Niagara Purple Eagles.

Club career
In 2016, he debuted at the senior level for Canadian SC in the Uruguayan Segunda División. In 2017, he went on trial with his former youth club Once Caldas. Later in 2017, he signed with Deportivo Pereira in the Colombian Categoría Primera B.

On 26 February 2019, Galvis signed with Canadian Premier League side Valour FC.

In June 2021, Galvis signed with League1 Ontario side Guelph United, after having attended 2021 pre-season with his former club Valour FC. He played one match in 2021, as he suffered an injury that kept him out for the remainder of the season.

In October 2022, he signed with FC Berlin in the United Premier Soccer League.

In February 2022, he joined Scrosoppi FC in League1 Ontario.

International career
He was called up by the Canadian senior team in June 2017 for a friendly against Curaçao, but did not play. He was named to Canada's provisional 40-man roster for the 2017 Gold Cup, but was ultimately not called up for the tournament.

References

1997 births
Living people
Association football midfielders
Colombian footballers
Canadian soccer players
Soccer people from Ontario
Footballers from Bogotá
People from Manizales
Sportspeople from St. Catharines
Colombian emigrants to Canada
Naturalized citizens of Canada
Canadian expatriate soccer players
Colombian expatriate footballers
Expatriate footballers in Uruguay
Canadian expatriate sportspeople in Uruguay
Colombian expatriate sportspeople in Uruguay
Expatriate soccer players in the United States
Canadian expatriate sportspeople in the United States
Colombian expatriate sportspeople in the United States
Once Caldas footballers
Defensor Sporting players
Canadian Soccer Club players
Deportivo Pereira footballers
Valour FC players
Uruguayan Segunda División players
Categoría Primera B players
Canadian Premier League players
Guelph United F.C. players
United Premier Soccer League players
FC Berlin (Canada/United States) players